Jarnagin is a surname. Notable people with the surname include:

Clark Jarnagin (1914–1979), American football and basketball coach
Hampton Jarnagin (died 1887), American politician from Mississippi, brother of Spencer
Spencer Jarnagin (1792–1853), American politician from Tennessee, brother of Hampton

See also
William Jernagin (1869–1958), American pastor and activist